Lin Cai is a Chinese-Canadian telecommunications engineer known for her work on topology control in wireless networks and in the applications of wireless communications to self-driving cars. She was educated at the University of Waterloo and is a professor of electrical and computer engineering at the University of Victoria.

Cai should be distinguished from a younger wireless networking engineer, also an alumna of the University of Waterloo named Lin Cai, who is a member of the faculty at the Illinois Institute of Technology. The younger Cai publishes as "Lin X. Cai", and has coauthored research with Lin Cai.

Education and career
Cai has a bachelor's degree from the Nanjing University of Science and Technology. She completed her Ph.D. at the University of Waterloo in 2005, and in the same year joined the University of Victoria faculty.

Recognition
Cai became an E. W. R. Steacie Memorial Fellow of the Canadian Natural Sciences and Engineering Research Council in 2019. She was named an IEEE Fellow in 2020, affiliated with the IEEE Vehicular Technology Society, "for contributions to topology control of wireless networks".  She was elected to the College of New Scholars of the Royal Society of Canada in 2020.

References

External links
Home page

Year of birth missing (living people)
Living people
Canadian telecommunications engineers
Canadian women engineers
Chinese telecommunications engineers
Chinese electrical engineers
Chinese women engineers
Nanjing University of Science and Technology alumni
University of Waterloo alumni
Academic staff of the University of Victoria
Fellow Members of the IEEE